Arizona State Parks is the governing agency of all Arizona state parks. The agency was created in 1957, following the rapid growth of the post-World War II recreation and tourism industries in the American Southwest. The agency's board was created in 1957, and currently has seven members plus an executive director.

References

External links
 Arizona State Parks: Home Page
 Arizona State Parks Foundation: Home Page

Government agencies established in 1955
State Parks
1955 establishments in Arizona